Horace Taylor may refer to:

Horace Adolphus Taylor (1837–1910), American politician from Wisconsin
Horace J. Taylor (1895–1961), English cricketer
Horace D. Taylor (1821–1890), commission merchant and mayor of Houston.